Mariano Wong (born 3 July 1997) is a Peruvian karateka. At the 2019 Pan American Games held in Lima, Peru, he won one of the bronze medals in the men's kata event.

Career 

In 2018, he won one of the bronze medals in the men's kata event at the South American Games held in Cochabamba, Bolivia. In the same year, he also competed in the men's individual kata event at the World Karate Championships held in Madrid, Spain.

In June 2021, he competed at the World Olympic Qualification Tournament held in Paris, France hoping to qualify for the 2020 Summer Olympics in Tokyo, Japan. In November 2021, he competed at the 2021 World Karate Championships held in Dubai, United Arab Emirates.

He won one of the bronze medals in the men's kata event at the 2022 Bolivarian Games held in Valledupar, Colombia. He won the silver medal in his event at the 2022 South American Games held in Asunción, Paraguay.

Achievements

References

External links 
 

Living people
1997 births
Place of birth missing (living people)
Peruvian male karateka
Pan American Games medalists in karate
Pan American Games bronze medalists for Peru
Medalists at the 2019 Pan American Games
Karateka at the 2019 Pan American Games
South American Games medalists in karate
South American Games silver medalists for Peru
South American Games bronze medalists for Peru
Competitors at the 2018 South American Games
Competitors at the 2022 South American Games
21st-century Peruvian people